Shared delusion may refer to:

 Dream sharing
 Folie à deux
 Shared delusional disorder